Abu Dhabi Plaza  (Kazakh: Абу Даби Плаза) is a mixed-use development complex in the very center of Astana, the capital of Kazakhstan.

Background
On 11 June 2009, after two years of completing the design stage, Kazakhstan and the United Arab Emirates signed an agreement on construction of the Abu Dhabi Plaza mixed-use development complex.

Main facilities of the complex
The tallest tower, which is includes 75 floors (~320m), contains offices and residential premises. The complex also includes two office towers with 29 and 31 floors respectively. A 15-storey residential tower is also part of the complex. The fifth building is a 14-floor hotel tower, the Sheraton Astana Hotel. The taller residential tower was completed in 2021.

The shopping center of Abu Dhabi Plaza was inaugurated on 2 December 2019. Its area is  accommodating shops and restaurants located on two levels.

See also
 List of tallest buildings in Astana
 List of tallest buildings in Kazakhstan
 List of tallest residential buildings

References

Skyscrapers in Kazakhstan
Buildings and structures under construction in Kazakhstan
Residential skyscrapers in Kazakhstan
Skyscraper office buildings